The thirty-eighth season of Saturday Night Live, an American sketch comedy series, originally aired in the United States on NBC between September 15, 2012 and May 18, 2013.

Also airing this season were two election-themed episodes of Saturday Night Live Weekend Update Thursday, which aired on September 20, 2012 and September 27, 2012. Two months before the season premiere, original writer and occasional featured player Tom Davis died after a two-year battle with throat and neck cancer.

Cast

Prior to the start of the season, longtime cast members Kristen Wiig and Andy Samberg, both of whom had been on the show for seven seasons since 2005, decided not to return following the end of the previous season. Following Samberg and Wiig's departures, Abby Elliott was let go after four seasons on the show since 2008. Vanessa Bayer, Taran Killam, and Jay Pharoah were all upgraded to repertory status, while Kate McKinnon remained a featured player.

To fill the void, the show hired three new cast members Chicago improvisers Aidy Bryant, Tim Robinson, and Cecily Strong as the replacements for Wiig, Samberg, and Elliott. According to the official press release, "Bryant trained at the iO Chicago, Annoyance Theatre and she was also part of the ensemble that performed on the Second City E.T.C Stage. Robinson also trained at the Second City, he performed on their Mainstage and was also part of their National Touring Company. Like Robinson, Strong had also performed as part of the National Touring Company and trained at the iO Theater".

This was the final season for longtime cast members Fred Armisen, Bill Hader, and Jason Sudeikis. Armisen had been on the show for 11 seasons since 2002, Sudeikis had been on for nine since 2005, and Hader had been on for eight since 2005. This would also be the only season for featured player Tim Robinson, who would leave his spot in the cast to instead join the writing staff the following season.

Cast roster

Repertory players
 Fred Armisen
 Vanessa Bayer
 Bill Hader
 Taran Killam
 Seth Meyers
 Bobby Moynihan
 Nasim Pedrad
 Jay Pharoah
 Jason Sudeikis
 Kenan Thompson

Featured players
 Aidy Bryant
 Kate McKinnon
 Tim Robinson
 Cecily Strong

bold denotes Weekend Update anchor

Writers

Seth Meyers and Colin Jost are the season's co-head writers. Prior to the start of the season, Upright Citizens Brigade Theater performers Josh Patten and Neil Casey joined the writing staff.

Episodes

Specials

Saturday Night Live Weekend Update Thursday

The third season of Saturday Night Live Weekend Update Thursday, a limited-run series based on Saturday Night Live'''s "Weekend Update" sketch, has aired in conjunction with this season. The specials focused on the United States presidential election. The show was hosted by Seth Meyers, Update'''s then current host.

References

38
Saturday Night Live in the 2010s
2012 American television seasons
2013 American television seasons
Television shows directed by Don Roy King